Shiro Kashiwa (October 24, 1912 – March 13, 1998) was an American lawyer and judge who was the first Attorney General of Hawaii to be appointed after it became a state in 1959. He served as a judge of the United States Court of Claims, then as a United States circuit judge of the United States Court of Appeals for the Federal Circuit in Washington, D.C. from 1982 to 1986. He was the first federal judge of Japanese-American descent, the first Asian American judge on the Federal Circuit and was a member of the Jōdo Shinshū sect of Buddhism.

Education and career

Born in Kohala, Hawaii, Kashiwa received a Bachelor of Science degree from University of Michigan in 1935, and was a member of Phi Kappa Phi. He received a Juris Doctor from University of Michigan Law School in 1936. He was in private practice of law in Honolulu, Hawaii from 1937 to 1959. He was the first state attorney general of Hawaii, from 1959 to 1963. He was in private practice of law in Honolulu from 1963 to 1969. He was an assistant United States attorney general of the Land and Natural Resources Division of the United States Department of Justice from 1969 to 1972. There he led the division's first suit against a thermal polluter, oversaw a major case against Armco Steel, and represented the government at the United States Supreme Court.

Federal judicial service

Kashiwa was nominated by President Richard Nixon on November 30, 1971, to a seat on the United States Court of Claims vacated by Judge James Randall Durfee. He was confirmed by the United States Senate on December 2, 1971, and received his commission on January 3, 1972. He was reassigned by operation of law on October 1, 1982, to the United States Court of Appeals for the Federal Circuit, to a new seat authorized by 96 Stat. 25. His service terminated on January 7, 1986, due to his retirement. Kashiwa died on March 13, 1998, in Honolulu.

See also
List of Asian American jurists
List of first minority male lawyers and judges in the United States
List of first minority male lawyers and judges in Hawaii

References

Sources

1912 births
1998 deaths
20th-century American judges
American Buddhists
American jurists of Japanese descent
Hawaii Attorneys General
Judges of the United States Court of Claims
Judges of the United States Court of Appeals for the Federal Circuit
United States Article I federal judges appointed by Richard Nixon
United States Assistant Attorneys General for the Environment and Natural Resources Division
University of Michigan Law School alumni